The University of Southern Denmark (abbr. SDU) is a university in Denmark that has campuses located in Southern Denmark and on Zealand.

The university offers a number of joint programmes in co-operation with the University of Flensburg and the University of Kiel. Contacts with regional industries and the international scientific community are strong.

With its 29,674 enrolled students (as of 2016), the university is both the third-largest and, given its roots in Odense University, the third-oldest Danish university (fourth if one includes the Technical University of Denmark). Since the introduction of the ranking systems in 2012, the University of Southern Denmark has been ranked between 36th (2012 ), 38th (2013 ), 37th (2014), and 44th (2015 ) in the world by the Times Higher Education World University Rankings in the Top 100 Universities Under 50 List. It is also one of the Top 50 Universities Under 50 according to QS World University Rankings from 2012-2015.

History
The University of Southern Denmark was established in 1998 when Odense University, the Southern Denmark School of Business and Engineering and the South Jutland University Centre were merged. The University Library of Southern Denmark was also merged with the university in 1998. As the original Odense University was established in 1966, the University of Southern Denmark celebrated their 50-year anniversary on September 15, 2016.

In 2006, the Odense University College of Engineering was merged into the university and renamed as the Faculty of Engineering. After being located in different parts of Odense for several years, a brand new Faculty of Engineering building physically connected to the main Odense Campus was established and opened in 2015. In 2007, the Business School Centre in Slagelse (Handelshøjskolecentret Slagelse) and the National Institute of Public Health (Statens Institut for Folkesundhed) were also merged into the University of Southern Denmark.

Princess Marie took over the role of the patron of the university in 2009.

Administration and organization
The university is governed by a board consisting of 9 members: 5 members recruited outside the university form the majority of the board, 1 member is appointed by the scientific staff, 1 member is appointed by the administrative staff, and 2 members are appointed by the students. The rector is appointed by the university board. The rector in turn appoints deans and deans appoint heads of departments. There is no faculty senate and faculty is not involved in the appointment of rector, deans, or department heads. Hence the university has no faculty governance.

The current rector is Jens Ringsmose, and the current Pro-vice-chancellor is Helle Waagepetersen.

Faculties, research, and teaching
As a national institution the University of Southern Denmark (SDU) comprises five faculties – Humanities, Science, Engineering, Social Sciences and Health Sciences totaling 32 departments, 11 research centers and a university library.
University Library of Southern Denmark is also a part of the university.

Research activities and student education make up the core activities of the university. The University of Southern Denmark also has widespread cooperation with business and industry in the region and considerable activities within continuing education. The university offers a number of degrees taught in English; examples include European Studies and American Studies.

The faculty of all six campuses comprises approximately 1,200 researchers in Odense, Kolding, Esbjerg, Sønderborg, Slagelse and Copenhagen; approximately 18,000 students are enrolled. The University of Southern Denmark offers programmes in five different faculties - Humanities, Science, Engineering, Social Sciences, and Health Sciences. It incorporates approximately 35 institutes, 30 research centres, and a well-equipped university library.

The university offers a wide range of traditional disciplines as well as a broad selection of business and engineering studies. In recent years the number of options available has been considerably expanded. Examples include the introduction of a very successful Journalism programme in Odense, Information Science in Kolding, and a Mechatronics Engineering programme in Sønderborg. The educational environments on the Jutland campuses have also been strengthened through the creation of new programmes such as a bachelor's degree in Sociology and Cultural Analysis, a bachelor's degree in Business Administration with Sports Management, a bachelor's in Public Health Science in Esbjerg, Danish and English Language Studies in Kolding, and a variety of engineering programmes and European Studies in Sønderborg. Moreover, the University of Southern Denmark is the only university in Scandinavia that offers a degree programme in chiropractic studies (Clinical Biomechanics).

The university focuses on areas such as communication, information technology, and biotechnology. Other areas of research are pursued through a number of national research centres at the university. Examples include The Hans Christian Andersen Center, the Centre for Sound Communication, and the Danish Biotechnology Instrument Centre. Odense in particular focuses on research within the field of geriatrics.

Co-operation with the business community has resulted in three substantial donations from some of the giants in Danish industry: Odense is the home of the Maersk Mc-Kinney Moller Institute for Production Technology, where robot technology is one of the many research areas. The Mads Clausen Institute in Sønderborg is engaged in the design and development of software for integration in the intelligent products of the future. Thanks to funding from Kompan and Lego, a research environment for the investigation of child behaviour and development has also been established.

The university is also hosting the Danish Institute for Advanced Study (DIAS), which brings outstanding researchers together in an interdisciplinary centre for fundamental research and intellectual inquiry. The Danish IAS exists to encourage and support curiosity-driven research in the sciences and humanities, and thereby unlock new revolutionary ideas.

Campuses

The University of Southern Denmark has six campuses, mainly located in the southern part of Denmark: campus Odense on the island of Funen, campus Slagelse and campus Copenhagen on the island of Zealand, as well as campus Kolding, campus Esbjerg and campus Alsion in Sønderborg, all on the Jutland peninsula.

The physical buildings of SDU cover an area of 272,554 m2 (2007), a figure that has increased from 181,450 m2 in 1999 when the university merger was implemented.

The university's campus in Odense is considered the main campus of the University of Southern Denmark, both because of its relative size and because the central administration of the university is situated there. Being an epitome of Danish functionalist architecture, the campus has been nicknamed Rustenborg (which roughly translates as The Rusty Castle) by students and staff, because it is built from gray concrete slabs clad with weathering steel, in an early architectural use of that material. Its architecture has also given rise to other nicknames and slang expressions among students and staff. For instance, the administrative block goes by the name of Førerbunkeren ("Führerbunker"), referring to the architectural similarities between the university building and a stereotypical military building. The students' magazine is simply called Rust.

See also
 Open access in Denmark

References

External links

 University of Southern Denmark 
 University Library of Southern Denmark 
 Tanulj Dániában - University of Southern Denmark - [Official Hungarian Community on Facebook] 
 Alsion, The new campus building in Sønderborg 
 Ivkstudiet.dk, International business communication site.  

 
Southern Denmark
Esbjerg
University, of Southern Denmark
Educational institutions established in 1998
Buildings and structures in the Region of Southern Denmark
1998 establishments in Denmark
Universities and colleges formed by merger in Denmark